Andrew "Andrucha" Waddington (born 20 January 1970) is a Brazilian film director, producer, and screenwriter.

Career
His several film credits include “Me You Them” (2000), Mention spéciale of Un Certain Regard in Cannes, an Official Selection of Toronto and Sundance Film Festivals, Brazil's official entry to the Oscars - Best Foreign Language Film - and winner, Best Film, at Karlovy Vary, Havana and Cartagena Film festivals; “The House of Sand” (2005) Berlin, Toronto and Sundance film festivals official selection, winner of the Sundance/NHK International Filmmakers Script  and Alfred Sloan awards; and the Brazil/Spain co-production “Lope” (2010), a Venice and Toronto official selection and winner of two Goya Awards.

Moreover, he directed and produced the TV Globo/ Conspiração drama series “Under Pressure” (2017-2018-2019), which got rave reviews and skyrocket ratings. He also directed and produced the Brazilian blockbuster “Party Crashers” (2012), the biopic “Chacrinha – O Velho Guerreiro“ (2018), the thriller “The Loss” (2019) and theatrical film documentaries as “Gilberto Gil – Viva São João” (2002), “Maria Bethania-Pedrinha de Aruanda” (2007) and "André Midani - from vinyl to download" ( 2015).

Andrucha Waddington has been a partner at Conspiração Filmes since 1995.

Filmography
 Paralamas em Close Up (1998)
 Gêmeas (1999)
 Eu Tu Eles (2000)
 Outros (Doces) Bárbaros (2000)
 Os Paralamas do Sucesso - Longo Caminho (2002)
 Gilberto Gil: Tempo Rei (2002)
 Viva São João! (2002)
 Casa de Areia (2005)
 'Y Ikatu Xingu (2006)
 Maria Bethânia - Pedrinha de Aruanda (2007)
 Lope (2010)
 Os Penetras (2012)
 Rio, I Love You (segment "Dona Fulana") (2014)
 Sob Pressão (2016)
 Os Penetras 2 (2017)
 Chacrinha, o Velho Guerreiro (2018)
 The Loss (2019)

TV shows 
 Under Pressure (2017-2019)
 Rio 2016 Olympic Games Opening Ceremony (TV Special)
 André Midani: do Vinil ao Download (2015)
 Retrato Celular (2007)

References

External links

1970 births
Living people
Brazilian people of English descent
Brazilian film directors
Brazilian women film directors
Brazilian film producers
Brazilian women film producers
Brazilian screenwriters
Brazilian women screenwriters
Alfred P. Sloan Prize winners